Mabior Chol (born 29 January 1997) is a professional Australian rules footballer playing for the Gold Coast Suns in the Australian Football League (AFL), having formerly played for the Richmond Football Club. He was drafted by Richmond in the 2016 rookie draft and made his debut in round 23, 2016. Chol was delisted by the club in 2018 before being immediately re-rookied in the 2019 rookie draft. In 2019 Chol won a VFL premiership while playing with the Richmond reserves side. Chol moved from Richmond to Gold Coast as a free agent in October 2021.

Early life and junior football
Chol was born in present-day South Sudan, before his family fled to Egypt to avoid the ongoing civil war when he was two years old. They moved to Australia in 2005 when Chol was eight years of age, settling in the Brisbane suburb of Acacia Ridge.

After playing soccer and basketball at a younger age, Chol took up Australian rules football when he joined the Yeronga State High School team at age 12. After playing in the state school final at The Gabba, he committed to playing the game at junior level the next year and joined the Yeronga South Brisbane Devils.

In 2013 Chol played for the World 18 team at the national under 16 championships. He later entered the junior Queensland development pathway and the  Academy where he would play in 2014 and 2015. Chol also played for Aspley and the Lions' reserve team in the NEAFL in addition to the Lions' under 18 team. In 2015 he played with the Allies in an under 18 match as a curtain raiser to the year's AFL Grand Final.

Chol was a strong performer in the 2015 AFL draft combine, recording the number one standing vertical jump score (334 cm), as well as placing second in the running vertical jump test (357 cm) and fourth in the relative running vertical jump test (90 cm). He also came second to future teammate Daniel Rioli in the 30 metre repeat sprint test (24.3 seconds). Prior to the draft he was also lauded by Queensland academy coach Adrian Fletcher for his positional versatility and his marking prowess.

AFL career

2016 season

He first represented Richmond in the club's 2016 pre-season match against Fremantle. He failed to gain selection at senior level as a result though, instead playing a majority of his season with the club's reserves side in the VFL. There he played in a myriad of roles, including as a key defender, key forward and as a ruck. He eventually made his AFL debut in Richmond's last match of the season, in round 23 against  at the Sydney Cricket Ground. Chol thereby became the fourth player of Sudanese descent (after Majak Daw, Aliir Aliir and Reuben William) to play senior AFL football.

2017 season

Over the 2017 pre-season Chol focused on developing his body, looking to add muscle weight and to improve his endurance running. Injuries to key forwards early in the season saw Chol in contention for a senior call-up, but coach Damien Hardwick told the media he was hesitant to play the "inexperienced" Chol. In late July Chol was involved in a training mishap, accidentally poking forward Jack Riewoldt in the eye and causing him to miss two matches as a result. By season's end Chol had failed to play senior football that year. He did however contribute in the reserves, kicking 13 goals over 22 matches including in the team's losing grand final.

2018 season
Chol played his first football of 2018 in February, travelling to Sydney to play in Richmond's AFLX squad for that year's exhibition series. In the pre-season tournament he played in one match and kicked one goal, playing a majority of the game as Richmond's lead ruck after Toby Nankervis suffered concussion early in that match. His performance earned the praise of Seven Network commentator Tim Watson, who predicted he would be playing AFL level football for Richmond by season's end. While he did not earn immediate selection, he would be named as an emergency for the first time in round 3. In early June Chol suffered a fracture in the fifth metatarsal of his foot while landing from a mark in training. The surgery and resulting recovery was expected to see him in a stabilising moon boot for three weeks and sideline him from matches for eight to ten weeks. By early-July he had resumed walking free of the boot and by late-August he was approaching the final stages of aerobic conditioning prior to a footballing return. He had failed to earn a senior match that year and the club subsequently delisted him at the end of the season. As part of the announcement, club officials said they would consider their options in regards to Chol, while The Age reported that Chol would be reselected by Richmond in the coming rookie draft should he fail to be recruited by another club in the interim. These reports proved correct when Chol was re-drafted to Richmond with the 45th pick in the 2019 rookie draft.

2019 season
He kicked five goals across the opening two rounds of the VFL season despite being switched through roles as a key forward, ruck and key back in those matches. Chol kicked a further seven goals over three VFL matches in May, before moving into a ruck role as injuries and suspension to the club's AFL rucks tested depth in that area at VFL level. He was best on ground in the VFL Dreamtime game in late May in that role, recording 23 disposals, 12 clearances, 22 hit outs and a goal in what coach Craig McRae called his best game in four seasons at the club. After being named an AFL emergency but going unselected in the final team in round 12, Chol was named as emergency but eventually called up to play when ruck Ivan Soldo was ruled out with illness in round 13. He kicked his first AFL goal in that match while also recording 13 hitouts and eight disposals in a ruck role shared with young teammate Noah Balta. Chol remained in the senior side following the mid-season bye and the return of Soldo in round 16, performing exceptionally in a forward role in which he kicked three goals and recorded 16 disposals and nine marks. As a result, he received five votes in the AFL Coaches Association player of the year award and one Brownlow Medal vote as third best player on the field. Chol kicked a goal in each his next five matches at AFL level, continuing to impact as a forward and relief ruck despite averaging a modest eight disposals per game. After nine straight matches at AFL level but going goalless and posting a total of eight disposals across rounds 21 and 22, Chol was dropped back to VFL level. His first match back was in a come-from-behind qualifying final win over the  reserves in which he posted 13 hitouts and kicked two goals. He was named as an emergency in the club's first AFL final the following weekend, before kicking another two goals in the VFL preliminary final as Richmond's reserves won through to that league's grand final.
Chol was an emergency again in the AFL preliminary final one week later, but was again unselected for the final team. Instead, he formed part of the Richmond VFL side that defeated  as the club won its first reserves grade premiership since 1997.
 Chol finished 2019 having played a career-best nine matches at AFL level and was Richmond's equal-leading goalkicker in the reserves, with 21 goals across 12 games including that year's VFL premiership.

2020 season
Chol played his first match for 2020 in the opening round of the AFL pre-season series, but was dropped back to reserves level for the second and final match following the return of the club's premier tall forwards, Jack Riewoldt and Tom Lynch, from State of Origin duties. Instead, he participated in a VFL practice match in the first week of March, which was to be his final competitive match in many months as the following week's reserves match was cancelled due to safety concerns as a result of the rapid progression of the COVID-19 pandemic into Australia. Though the AFL season would start on schedule later that month, just one round of matches was played of the reduced 17-round season before the imposition of state border restrictions saw the season suspended for an indefinite period. When the season resumed after an 11-week hiatus, Chol played in an unofficial scratch match against 's reserves due to AFL clubs' withdrawal from the VFL season. He continued to earn AFL selection over coming weeks, including after the club was relocated to the Gold Coast in response to a virus outbreak in Melbourne. He was omitted from the club's round 14 side however, overlooked in place of returning ruck Toby Nankervis. Chol spent three rounds out of the side before earning an AFL recall following a five goal showing in a mid-September practice match against the  reserves. It was to be his last match of the season however, with Lynch returning from injury for the club's semi-final and Chol relegated to emergency status for each of the three remaining finals in the club's premiership run. He finished the season having played 11 of a possible 21 matches, kicking a total of eight goals.

2021 season
After taking part in the club's pre-season matches as part of an extended team line-up, Chol began the season proper with Richmond's reserves side in the VFL. He was named a non-playing AFL emergency on several occasions over the opening two and a half months of the season, as the primary backup to lead ruck Toby Nankervis in the wake of a long-term knee injury to other senior ruck Ivan Soldo.

2022 season
At the conclusion of the 2021 AFL season, Chol exercised his rights as a free agent and moved to the Gold Coast Suns. In round 1, against the West Coast Eagles at Optus Stadium Chol kicked 2 goals, within a game that the Suns won, including a Goal of The Year nomination. In Round 20 Chol played his 50th game. He kicked 5 goals in their 3 point win against  at Metricon Stadium.

Player profile
Chol plays as a tall forward and relief ruck. He is notable for his athletic traits, including ground-level agility and a powerful vertical leap.

Statistics
Statistics are correct to the end of Round 23 2022

|- style="background-color: #EAEAEA"
| 2016 ||  || 41 || 1 || 0 || 1 || 2 || 0 || 2 || 1 || 1 || 0 || 0.0 || 1.0 || 2.0 || 0.0 || 2.0 || 1.0 || 1.0 || 0.0
|-
! scope="row" style="text-align:center" | 2017
|
| 41 || 0 || — || — || — || — || — || — || — || — || — || — || — || — || — || — || — || — 
|- style="background-color: #EAEAEA"
! scope="row" style="text-align:center" | 2018
|
| 41 || 0 || — || — || — || — || — || — || — || — || — || — || — || — || — || — || — || — 
|-
! scope="row" style="text-align:center" | 2019
|
| 41 || 9 || 9 || 5 || 49 || 23 || 72 || 22 || 28 || 72 || 1.0 || 0.6 || 5.4 || 2.6 || 8.0 || 2.4 || 3.1 || 8.0
|- style="background-color: #EAEAEA"
| 2020 ||  || 41 || 11 || 8 || 3 || 39 || 27 || 66 || 15 || 17 || 66 || 0.7 || 0.3 || 3.5 || 2.5 || 6.0 || 1.4 || 1.5 || 6.0
|-
! scope="row" style="text-align:center" | 2021
|
| 41 || 10 || 7 || 4 || 59 || 41 || 100 || 31 || 25 || 23 || 0.7 || 0.4 || 5.9 || 4.1 || 10.0 || 3.1 || 2.5 || 12.3
|- style="background-color: #EAEAEA"
| 2022 ||  
|| 1 || 22 || 44 || 27 || 142 || 43 || 185 || 80 || 28 || 88 || 2.0 || 1.2 || 6.4 || 1.9 || 8.4 || 3.6 || 1.2 || 4.0
|-
|- class="sortbottom"
! colspan=3| Career
! 53
! 68
! 40
! 291
! 134
! 425
! 149
! 99
! 349
! 1.2
! 0.7
! 5.4
! 2.5
! 8.0
! 2.8
! 1.8
! 6.5
|}

Notes

Honours and achievements
VFL
 VFL premiership player: 2019

Personal life
In 2019 Chol began dying a strip of his black hair blond, resembling the Richmond guernsey design. However, once he moved over to the Gold Coast Suns, he shaved his head bald to resemble his idol Gary Ablett junior.

Chol is an ambassador for The Growth Project, an organisation dedicated to fostering community engagement for young Melburnians of Sudanese heritage.

References

External links

Mabior Chol's statistics from Footy Wire

1997 births
Living people
VFL/AFL players born outside Australia
Richmond Football Club players
Gold Coast Football Club players
Aspley Football Club players
Australian rules footballers from Queensland
South Sudanese emigrants to Australia
Sportspeople of South Sudanese descent
South Sudanese refugees
South Sudanese players of Australian rules football
Sportspeople from Brisbane
Refugees in Egypt